3-Iodotyrosine is an intermediate in the synthesis of thyroid hormones which is derived from iodination of tyrosine at the meta-position of the benzene ring.  One unit can combine with diiodotyrosine to form triiodothyronine, as occurs in the colloid of the thyroid follicle.  Two units can combine to form 3,3'-diiodothyronine.

3-Iodotyrosine is a reversible inhibitor of the enzyme tyrosine hydroxylase.

Relevance in dopamine studies
3-Iodotyrosine, a pathway inhibitor in the synthesis of the neurotransmitter dopamine, was used to determine the effects of decreased dopamine levels in social spacing of Drosophila melanogaster.  3-4 day old flies that were fed 3-iodotyrosine for 24 hours were shown to have altered dopamine levels.

References

Iodinated tyrosine derivatives
Tyrosine hydroxylase inhibitors